John McQuaid (born 24 May 1960) is an Irish former cyclist. He competed in the road race at the 1988 Summer Olympics.

References

External links
 

1960 births
Living people
Irish male cyclists
Olympic cyclists of Ireland
Cyclists at the 1988 Summer Olympics
Place of birth missing (living people)